This article lists attacks that have occurred in Mali since 2020.

The attacks left at least 181 people dead and another 56 were injured. At least 20 attackers were also killed in this attacks.

Timeline of attacks

2020

2021

See also
Battle of Konna
Insurgency in the Maghreb (2002–present)
Ogossagou massacre
Timeline of the Mali War
Tuareg rebellion (2012)

References

2020 murders in Mali
2021 murders in Mali
July 2020 crimes in Africa
July 2020 events in Africa
June 2020 crimes in Africa
August 2020 crimes in Africa
Gao Region
Mass murder in 2020
Mass murder in 2021
Mopti Region
October 2020 crimes in Africa
October 2020 events in Africa
Terrorist incidents in Africa in 2020
Islamic terrorism in Mali